Tunisian underground music refers to music performed by Tunisian artists that play or compose in a style different from the established Tunisian mainstream (most notably classic Malouf or arab pop). Using the term underground to define a performing arts movement or scene in the Arab world, including Tunisia, takes on a slightly different meaning compared to the one generally understood when used in the western countries. Given that contemporary Tunisian mainstream music includes only a few different musical styles, underground music has come to include any artist or band that sings or composes in a different genre. For example, while there's nothing underground about reggae on the international stage, Tunisian reggae bands may still be considered part of the Tunisian underground scene. The underground music scene in Tunisia is growing fast, and in the past two decades there has been a considerable increase in the number of bands trying out all sorts of musical genres, moving the boundaries of what is considered underground.

Heavy metal

The most active scene is arguably that of Tunisian heavy metal bands, most notably Myrath, but also Persona, Nawather , Carthagods and Ymyrgar. Most of these bands sing in English and sometimes include Arabic sentences in the chorus of their songs. While several bands compose their own music, many of them perform covers.

Rap
In contrast to Tunisian heavy metal bands, most Tunisian rappers perform in Tunisian (the local Arabic dialect). The Tunisian rap scene is very productive but it is still widely based on self-producing MCs such as Wled Bled Crew (Balti...), T-man (Nizar...), Arab Clan (Karoura...),Warda Crew (Wistar),Slim Larnaaout, AMYNE, WELD EL 15, Kamel Zmen, La Masse, BmG , Armada Bizerta, Samara, Joujma, Tchiggy , BadBoy 7low, JenJoon plus a growing number of music producers known by their unique sound quality and creativity such as Dj Killer, Dj Momo.

Electronic music
Electronic music also took place in the scene, and many Tunisian DJs and producers are participating not only on the local scene but also on the international one. Since the Electro and trance "craze" gave its fans to Deep House and Tech house and some Techno, Minimal and Dubstep making a larger and open minded scene, which helped to create new concepts that unites the underground scene together.

The Tunisian Underground music scene also contains one of the first underground music labels in the country such as Logo Tunisia Records, M-DMC Records.

See also
 Music of Tunisia

References

External links
 Logo Tunisia Records: First Underground Electronic music label in Tunisia.
Red Diamond Tunisia: Tunisian music label established as an independent digital distribution and management label.
 HarDoos.com: Online Metal Community, News and Gigs in Tunisia.
 TuniZika.com: A blog about alternative and contemporary Tunisian music. It features a downloadable audio program (in mp3 or podcast formats) which presents every other week 4 contemporary Tunisian artists. Most of the bands selected are promising unsigned artists.
 Zanzana.com: A Tunisian website dedicated to the local metal, punk and gothic fans. It has a large database of artist interviews and profiles as well as concert listings and runs a forum related to the radio program Zanzana hosted by Karim Benamor on Radio Tunis Chaine Internationale (RTCI).
El Distro Network: Records and Publishing Inc. is an Irish-tunisian distribution company and record label founded in 2017

Tunisian music